Centenary colony is the Mandal Headquarters for Ramagiri Mandal and it is a township of the Singareni Collieries Company located near to 8th Incline Colony, Godavarikhani, in Peddapalli district, Telangana state, India. The name "centenary" given to the colony as a significance for digging the coal from past 100 years.

Cities and towns in Peddapalli district